Holism is the idea that various systems (e.g. physical, biological, social) should be viewed as wholes, not merely as a collection of parts. The term "holism" was coined by Jan Smuts in his 1926 book Holism and Evolution. While his ideas had racist connotations, the modern use of the word generally refers to treating a person as an integrated whole, rather than as a collection of separate systems. For example, well-being may be regarded as not merely physical health, but also psychological and spiritual well-being.

Meaning
The exact meaning of "holism" depends on context. Jan Smuts originally used "holism" to refer to the tendency in nature to produce wholes from the ordered grouping of unit structures. However, in common usage, "holism" usually refers to the idea that a whole is greater than the sum of its parts. In this sense, "holism" may also be spelled "wholism" (although the two are not etymologically related), and it may be contrasted with reductionism or atomism.

Practices 
The term holistic when applied to diet refers to an intuitive approach to food, eating, or lifestyle. One example is in the context of holistic nursing, where "holism" refers to assessment of a person's health, including psychological and societal factors, rather than only their physical conditions or symptoms. In this sense, holism may also be called "holiatry." Some religious institutions practice a holistic dietary and health approach, such as Hinduism and the Seventh-day Adventist Church.

Philosophy 
In philosophy of science, logical holism is the concept that a theory can only be understood in its entirety. This has also been called methodological holism. Similarly, semantic holism makes the claim that meaningful statements about complex phenomena cannot be reduced to the actions of individuals.

Michael Esfeld has suggested that holism is opposed to analytic philosophy, "holism with respect to intentional phenomena is widespread among analytic philosophers".

Physics
Holism in physics refers to the inseparability of certain phenomena, especially quantum phenomena. Classical physics cannot be regarded as holistic, as the behavior of individual parts represents the whole. However, the state of a system in quantum theory resists similar analysis. The quantum state of a system is often described as 'entangled', and thus inseparable for meaningful analysis.

See also 

Antireductionism
Christian materialism
Dialectical materialism
Emergentism
Gaia hypothesis
Holistic education
Holism in science
Monism
Organicism
Reductionism
Synergy
Systems theory
Transdisciplinarity

References

Further reading 
 Fodor, Jerry, and Ernst Lepore, Holism: A Shopper's Guide Wiley. New York. 1992
 Phillips, D.C. Holistic Thought in Social Science. Stanford University Press. Stanford. 1976.

External links 

 
Philosophical theories
Natural philosophy
Philosophy of science
Social theories
Emergence
Jan Smuts